Disk User was a bi-monthly magazine for the BBC Micro range of 8-bit microcomputers. Its coverdisks contained graphical demos and pre-release previews of upcoming software.

References

Bi-monthly magazines published in the United Kingdom
Defunct computer magazines published in the United Kingdom
Home computer magazines
Magazines established in 1987
Magazines with year of disestablishment missing